The Laperal Guesthouse, popularly known as Laperal White House, is a building in Baguio, Philippines which housed a museum and is now the home of a new restaurant called Joseph's (owned by the older brother of ABS-CBN News broadcast journalist, Bernadette Sembrano).

History
The house was built by Roberto Laperal in the 1930s. The house is made of narra and yakal wood, designed in Victorian style with its wooden planks and gables and steep roof. The clan heads, Roberto and Victorina Laperal made the house as their vacation home.

The house was sold by Roberto Laperal Jr. and his wife, Purificacion Manotok Laperal. The house withstood many natural and man-made disasters, such as the 1990 Luzon earthquake.

Chinese Filipino billionaire tycoon Lucio Tan purchased the property in 2007 but never stayed in the place during his trips to Baguio. He instead had it renovated and refurbished with proper maintenance then made it into a tourist attraction. From then on, the house was opened to public.

In 2013, the tycoon's Tan Yan Kee Foundation transformed the house into a Bamboo Foundation museum which houses Filipino artworks made of bamboo and wood.

In popular culture
According to believers, the house is haunted. The 2010 horror movie White House featured the building.

Photo gallery

See also

 List of reportedly haunted locations in the Philippines
 Diplomat Hotel

References

Buildings and structures in Baguio
Historic house museums in the Philippines
Reportedly haunted locations in the Philippines